Michael Lomax (born 25 September 1978 in Chingford, London is a British Welterweight boxer. Nicknamed "The Look", Lomax is a former ABA champion and was the winner of Prizefighter 3: The Welterweights

Early career
In July 2005, at the age of 25, Lomax began his professional boxing career with a decision victory over journeyman Ernie Smith. Lomax boxed his way to a 10-0 record before a points draw with Silence Saheed ended his winning run in March 2007. On 6 July 2007, Lomax was outclassed on his way to a points defeat to Craig Watson.

Prizefighter
During the Prizefighter tournament held on 23 October 2008, Lomax suffered two cuts in his first bout with Craig Dickson. He received two stitches to a cut in his forehead before going on to defeat former British light-welterweight champion Nigel Wright on a close points decision. Lomax had previously lost to Wright during his amateur career. In the final he defeated former European light-welterweight champion Ted Bami to claim the £25,000 prize.

External links

1978 births
Living people
English male boxers
Welterweight boxers
Prizefighter contestants